Carretera Costera Riviera Mayo (Mayo Riviera Coastal Road) formerly known as Brecha de Sinaloa is a state road in the Mexican state of Sonora. It runs from Agiabampo to Yavaros.

Route description
As of January 2009 Mayo Riviera Coastal Road is a dirt road except the part running from the intersection to the road to Mexican Federal Highway 15 in Las Bocas to the beach of Camahuiroa. This part was opened in 2008.

References

State highways in Sonora